Stanisław Radziejowski (1575–1637) was a Polish nobleman, Voivode of Rawa, Voivode of Łęczyca, starost of Sochaczew, castellan of Rawa Mazowiecka.

Married firstly Katarzyna Sobieska, father of Hieronim Radziejowski, later married to Krystyna Sapieha, the daughter of Jan Piotr Sapieha.

Bibliography
„Polski Słownik Biograficzny” (tom 30, str. 79)
Hr. Seweryn Uruski „Rodzina. Herbarz Szlachty Polskiej” (tom 15, str. 133)

1570s births
1637 deaths
Stanislaw
16th-century Polish nobility
17th-century Polish nobility